"The Cryonic Woman" is the nineteenth and final episode of the second season of Futurama. It originally aired on the Fox network in the United States on December 3, 2000. The plot incorporates a cryonics theme. Sarah Silverman does the voice of Fry's on and off girlfriend Michelle (replacing Kath Soucie, who voiced the character in Space Pilot 3000).

Plot
To entertain themselves, Fry and Bender fly off with the Planet Express Ship. The ship is anchored to the building using an unbreakable diamond tether. As the ship is piloted on a round-the-world joyride, the building is dragged behind it, smashing into a number of landmarks. Professor Farnsworth has Hermes fire Fry and Bender for taking the ship, and Leela for leaving the keys in the ship knowing of their stupidity.

Leela re-implants her and Fry's old career chips, but she mixes them up. Fry is hired for Leela's old cryogenics counselor job, Leela is forced to be a delivery boy, and Bender has the arm and the career chip from the prime minister of Norway. In the lab, Fry finds that Pauly Shore is frozen in a tube and thaws him out. Shore explains he was supposed to be thawed out in Hollywood for the 1000-year anniversary screening of Jury Duty II. When Fry goes to greet the next thawed person, he is shocked to find that it is his old girlfriend, Michelle, who froze herself back in the year 2000 after her life fell apart.

Fry introduces Michelle to the world of the year 3000, but she has problems adapting to the future. She convinces Fry to join her as she re-freezes herself for another thousand years. They awake in a post-apocalyptic wasteland with a green, polluted sky. They join a society of feral children armed with heavy weaponry. Though initially content to be a member of the society, at Michelle's nagging Fry challenges the leader of the society. Fry and the teen wage a Deathboarding street battle amongst freeways and armored cars battling one another with machine guns. Their battle is prematurely ended when the children are picked up for Hebrew school by their mother in an armored SUV. Confused by this new world and tired of Michelle's nagging, Fry leaves her and wanders through the desolate wilderness on his own.

Fry spots signs of a city on the horizon. When he arrives, he finds himself standing in front of Grauman's Chinese Theater. The Planet Express ship lands in the street, and the crew leaps out, glad to have found Fry. They explain to Fry that he and Michelle were actually only frozen for two days. The desolate wasteland is not a post-apocalyptic New York in the year 4000, but Los Angeles in the year 3000. Fry was in Pauly Shore's tube, and when the delivery crew discovered en route to Hollywood that Pauly Shore was not in the tube, they tossed it into a ditch. A limousine passes by, revealing that Michelle is now in a relationship with Pauly.

As the Planet Express ship flies home, Fry asks The Professor if he can have his job back. The Professor, after being reminded by Bender of what happened earlier in the episode, drops Fry through a trap door instead.

References

External links

 
The Cryonic Woman at The Infosphere.

Futurama (season 2) episodes
2000 American television episodes
Television episodes about termination of employment

fr:La Femme cryonique